Dotyk is the debut studio album by Polish singer Edyta Górniak which was released in Poland on May 8, 1995, by Pomaton EMI.

The album was certified 4× Platinum selling over half a million copies.

Track listing

 Jestem kobietą
 Będę śniła
 Dotyk
 Szyby
 Niebo to my
 Nie opuszczaj mnie
 Litania
 Kasztany
 Pada śnieg
 To nie ja
 Jej portret

Singles 

 Once In A Lifetime – To nie ja

Promo singles 

 Jestem kobietą
 Dotyk
 Będę śniła

Music videos 

 To nie ja
 Once In A Lifetime
 Jestem kobietą
 Dotyk

Certifications and sales

References

1995 albums